Diachronic approaches in linguistic analysis consider the development and evolution of a language through history.

Diachronic may also refer to:
 Diachronic linguistics, the scientific study of language change over time
 Diachronism, a sedimentary rock formation in which material varies in age with the place where it was deposited

See also
 Synchronic (disambiguation)
 Dichronic, an anti-inflammatory drug also known as Voltaren or Diclofenac
 Dichroic, material which causes light to be split up into beams of different wavelengths or polarizations
 Max More (born 1964), a futurist and the author of The Diachronic Self